Alan John Steve Haydock (born Uccle, 13 January 1976) is a Belgian football player of British descent who plays in the midfield. He currently plays for S.K. Halle.

He started his career with Diegem Sport in the lower divisions then moved to the defunct R.W.D. Molenbeek in 1994. Haydock scored a goal on his debut against AA Gent in 1995. In 2000, he moved to R.A.A. Louviéroise, another side from the Jupiler League where he played 3 seasons, won the Belgian Cup final in 2003 and participated in the UEFA Cup matches against Benfica the following year. In 2003, he joined F.C. Brussels, the de facto successor to his former club Molenbeek, where he stayed for five seasons and became club captain. On Brussels' relegation from the Jupiler League in 2008, he joined newly promoted A.F.C. Tubize.

Haydock was selected in the Belgium Under-21 national team on 6 occasions.

References

1976 births
Living people
Belgian footballers
R.A.A. Louviéroise players
R.W.D.M. Brussels F.C. players
A.F.C. Tubize players
People from Uccle
Association football midfielders
Belgian people of British descent
Belgian Pro League players
Belgium youth international footballers
Footballers from Brussels